The 2011 Giro del Trentino was the 35th edition of the Giro del Trentino cycling stage race. It was held from 19–22 April 2011, as 2.HC event on the UCI Europe Tour. Italian Michele Scarponi of  won the overall classification after moving into the leader's jersey after stage 2. Tiago Machado was second, Luca Ascani third.

Teams and cyclists
There were 18 teams in the 2011 Giro del Trentino. Among them were 7 UCI ProTeams, seven UCI Professional Continental teams, and four Continental teams. Each team was allowed eight riders on their squad, giving the event a peloton of 144 cyclists at its outset. The favourites were: Vincenzo Nibali, Roman Kreuziger and Michele Scarponi, all of them preparing for the Giro d'Italia.

Tour stages

Stage 1
19 April 2011 – Riva del Garda to Arco,

Stage 2
20 April 2011 – Dro to Ledro Bezzecca,

Stage 3
21 April 2011 – Molina di Ledro to Fai della Paganella,

Stage 4
22 April 2011 – Andalo to Madonna di Campiglio,

References

Giro del Trentino
Giro del Trentino
Tour of the Alps